The de-Tatarization of Crimea refers to the Soviet and Russian efforts to remove traces of the indigenous Crimean Tatar presence from the peninsula. De-Tatarization has manifested in various ways throughout history, from the full-scale deportation and exile of Crimean Tatars in 1944 to other measures such as the burning of Crimean Tatar books published in the 1920s and toponym renaming.

Manifestations

Topography renaming 
The vast majority of districts, raions, villages, and geographic features in Crimea bearing Crimean Tatar names were given Slavic and communist names shortly after the deportation of the Crimean Tatars by the Soviet regime, per a decree of the Crimean Regional Committee mandating such renaming. Most places in Crimea still bear the post-deportation names, many redundant, that were imposed in the 1940s to remove traces of Crimean Tatar existence. Very few localities  Bakhchysarai, Dzhankoy, İşün, Alushta, Alupka, and Saky  were given their original names back after the fall of the Soviet Union.

Propaganda 

Soviet party officials in Crimea indoctrinated the Slavic population of Crimea with Tatarophobia, depicting Crimean Tatars as "traitors", "bourgeoisie", or "counter-revolutionaries", and falsely implying that they were "Mongols" with no historical connection to the Crimean peninsula (despite their Greek, Italian, Armenian, and Gothic roots.) A 1948 conference in Crimea was dedicated to promoting and sharing anti-Crimean-Tatar sentiments.

Amet-khan Airport 

The attempts to paint Amet-khan Sultan as a Dagestani contrary to his Crimean origins has faced backlash from the Crimean Tatar community. Despite the flying ace being born in Crimea to a Crimean Tatar mother and always identifying himself as Crimean Tatar, the Russian Federation named a Dagestani Airport after him while naming Crimea's main airport after Ivan Aivazovsky instead, ignoring numerous petitions from the Crimean Tatar community requesting that the airport bearing Amet-khan's name be in his homeland.

See also 
 Imperialism
 Ethnic cleansing
 Settler colonialism
 Russification
 Hebraization of Palestine
 Colonization of the Americas

References

Citations

Bibliography

External links
 Crimean Tatar language names of places in Crimea

History of Crimea
Ethnic cleansing in Europe
Racism in the Soviet Union
Political repression in the Soviet Union
Linguistic discrimination
Russification
Soviet ethnic policy
Tatarophobia
Language policy in Russia